Gradno is a small village in the Municipality of Brda in the Littoral region of Slovenia.

Name
The name of the settlement was changed from Grabno to Gradno in 1952.

Church
The parish church in the settlement is dedicated to Saint George and belongs to the Diocese of Koper.

References

External links
Gradno on Geopedia

Populated places in the Municipality of Brda